Dagobah is a fictional planet and eponymous star system appearing in the Star Wars films The Empire Strikes Back, Return of the Jedi, and Revenge of the Sith, and other media. It is depicted as a world of murky swamps, steaming bayous, and jungles, resembling Earth during the Carboniferous period. Dagobah is 14,410 kilometers in diameter with an orbital period of 341 days. Dagobah's climate and atmosphere consists of two seasons; a dry season, where the uplands become too hot for most life forms to survive; and a wet season, consisting of violent lightning storms, dense fog, and long periods of torrential rainfall. Tash were a sentient species native to Dagobah.

The Dagobah System lies within the Dagobah Subsector of the Sluis Sector, located in the Outer Rim Territories galactic quadrant region; 50,250 light-years from Coruscant. The sun was called Dagobah Prime. It is noted as being a former "Sith nexus" that's very strong with the Force, particularly "the Dark Side", and being chosen by Jedi Yoda as the planet to go into exile on to mask his presence and avoid discovery by the Galactic Empire.

Depiction

Film
Dagobah was originally featured in the 1980 film The Empire Strikes Back. In its first appearance, the main protagonist of the film, Luke Skywalker, is attempting to land his X-wing starfighter on the planet and is met with a dense fog causing him to crash land in a small bayou. Shortly after his landing, the Jedi Master Yoda is introduced during his time in exile. Yoda reluctantly agrees to train Skywalker and during his training many aspects of the planet's environment are utilized. Moss-covered rocks are used for training in telekinesis, the undergrowth makes treks through the jungles more challenging, and vines hanging from tall trees are used as means to get across small bodies of water and other obstacles. Skywalker is shown to sense the strength of the Force in a particular cave on the planet which Yoda tells him to go into. Inside the cave, Skywalker is met with a mental challenge the dark side of the Force developed for him.

The planet is also seen briefly in Return of the Jedi to depict Yoda's death and is featured in a deleted scene from Revenge of the Sith showing Yoda's arrival on the planet. George Lucas reportedly said it was removed so the film would not have "too many endings." The scene was released under the title "Exile to Dagobah" on the film's DVD.

Other media
The Clone Wars featured Dagobah in a sixth-season episode, in which Yoda traveled to the planet as part of his own training to gain immortality through the Force.

In the Star Wars expanded universe, Yoda confronted a Bpfasshi Dark Jedi on Dagobah, some years before the events in The Empire Strikes Back, and the cave where the Dark Jedi died became strong in the dark side of the Force. Star Wars Tales later retconned this event to take place earlier, with another Jedi of Yoda's species named Minch replacing Yoda. Dagobah was also visited by the main characters of the Galaxy of Fear series, where it was home for a time to a tribe of cannibals. During the events of Jedi Knight: Jedi Academy, a team of Jedi Knights from the New Jedi Order visit Dagobah, to find the cave drained of its former menace.

After the events of Return of the Jedi, the New Republic founded a military base on one of the greatest mountains of the planet, named 'Mount Yoda' after the Jedi Master.

Description
Largely looked over by the Galactic Republic, Dagobah is the only habitable planet in the system of the same name within the Sluis sector. A cloudy and swampy world of dense foliage, countless living things of all sizes, including reptiles, amphibians, and swarming insects, fill its environs with a hum of constant noise. All of its creatures appear completely unintelligent. Larger life-forms occupy cave-like hollows formed by petrified forests. Carnivorous "gnarltrees" reproduce as spiderlike mobile creatures which eventually metamorphose into their rooted form. The planet is also noted for being strong with the Force.

See also
 List of Star Wars planets and moons
 Carboniferous

References

Sources

External links
 Dagobah in the Star Wars Databank
 

Star Wars planets
Fictional terrestrial planets
Forest planets in fiction
Fictional elements introduced in 1980